Uncivilized Area is an album by the trance fusion band the Disco Biscuits. It was released in 1998 on Megaforce Records.

The album was among the earliest examples of "trance fusion" or "livetronica," a mixture of electronic music and traditional jam band music.

Critical reception
Dean Budnick, in his book Jambands: The Complete Guide to the Players, Music, & Scene, gave the album a 4-star review, calling it "one of the most influential discs within these pages."

Track listing
"Vassillios" – 6:18
"Aceetobee" – 10:55
"Jamillia" – 7:39
"Little Betty Boop" – 15:11
"M.E.M.P.H.I.S." – 4:59
"Morph Dusseldorf" – 7:56
"I-Man" – 13:13
"Awol's Blues" – 5:44

Personnel
 Jon Gutwillig – Guitar
 Marc Brownstein – Bass
 Sam Altman – Drums
 Aron Magner – Keyboards
 James SK Wān – Flute

References

1998 albums
Disco Biscuits albums